The Jacksons: Next Generation is an American reality television series that stars members of the group 3T, and other members of the Jackson family. It  aired on the American cable channel Lifetime between October 2, and November 6, 2015.

Background 
Performing since the 1980s the sons of Tito Jackson, Taryll, TJ and Taj known as the music group 3T saw considerable success in the 1990s, selling more than three million copies  of their debut album, Brotherhood, and touring in Europe in early 1997.

On August 3, 2015, Lifetime announced that they ordered a docuseries that would follow the three brothers as they work to jumpstart their career, plan to record a new album and live "as traditional family men while living up to the pressures and demands that comes with their last name ”facing constant rumorus, stalkers and frauds who all want a piece of anything and anyone related to the family’s legacy.” Talking to journalist Paulette Cohn TJ Jackson said “For me, it’s about showing who we are as a family, and going beyond the brand ‘Jackson,’ and showing that there's real people behind that brand. Taryll Jackson added "it’s also finding a way for us to do something, where the focus is not just us, but what it is we’re doing. “If we’re creating an album, how do we make it about the music and not about Michael Jackson’s nephews?”

Taj Jackson wanted to use the series to counter rumors and misconceptions about his family. "We are a private family but at the same time, with social media, if you don’t address certain things, people think it’s true and people keep spreading those lies and rumors. I’ve seen people quote stuff on message boards that are completely false. And then someone else picks it up and starts quoting it, and it’s kind of one of those things where we have to just nip it in the bud." Reportedly, two of Michael's children asked to be in the show after their cousin TJ pulled them aside and told them what they were planning to do.

Synopsis
Still affected by the loss of their mother Dee Dee, and the death of their uncle Michael, the brothers live their day-to-day life, raising their children like many others. The good and the bad of living with a world-famous name often stand in the way of their quest for normalcy. TJ faces additional challenges as the co-legal guardian of Prince, Paris and Blanket, the three children of his uncle Michael, and the brothers' cousins.

Reception
Reviews in The New York Times and Variety were mixed with Variety taking a considerable more cynical approach regarding the motives behind the series.
Jon Caramanica wrote that the brothers seemed vulnerable and didn't play for the cameras. And that "lack of artifice is built into the show itself".
According to   Brian Lowry it was hard to imagine a more glaring demonstration of irony and hypocrisy than this series, and he accused the brothers of using the show to plot a comeback and secure another 15 minute fame .

Movie and television critic Melissa Camacho called the series a "somewhat bland "celebreality series" which "doesn't offer anything beyond its standard reality contemporaries" but praised it for its positive message about the importance of family.

Episodes

References

External links
The Jacksons: Next Generation  IMDB

2015 American television series debuts
Lifetime (TV network) original programming
African-American reality television series
2010s American reality television series
English-language television shows
2015 American television series endings